Nemanja Kovačević (born March 19, 1985) is a Serbian professional basketball player for Grasshopper Zürich of the Championnat LNB.

Early career 
As a pioneer and cadet (1998–2003), he took the team of Beopetrol. With Beopetrol becomes champion of the Cadet Championship of Serbia and Champion of the Cadet Championship FR Yugoslavia, since 2003 he goes to Atlas, conquers the junu Serbia and 3rd place for juniors of Serbia and Montenegro. Here he starts his professional career.

Professional career 
Kovačević played for Atlas/Beopetrol, Jagodina, Ulcinj, Hercegovac Bileća, Leotar from Trebinje, Svislajon Takovo from Vršac, Radnički Kragujevac, Tamiš from Pančevo, Vojvodina Srbijagas from Novi Sad, Čapljina Lasta, PVSK Panthers from Pécs, Hungary, Shahrdari Gorgan BC from Iran, Pitesti from Romania, Levicki Patrioti from Slovakia, Građanski from Bijeljina, Swiss Central from Switzerland. In the 2008–09 season, he played for Swisslion Vršac with which he managed to choose to participate in the ABA League.

Career highlights and awards 
 Defensive Player of the year in Bosnia and Herzegovina in the season 2011/12.
 1st place in the Super League with 5.2 assists per game.
 1st place in the Super League with 2.2 goals per game.
 2. MVP of the Bosnian Super League (League 6) 2012/13.
 2nd best five in the Iranian Superliga in the season 2013/14.
 2nd place in the Super League with 4.17 assists per game.
 In the best team of Iranian Superliga 2013/14.
 The top five at All-Star Games SBL League 2015/16, Slovakia.
 2nd best league assistant 2016/17, Switzerland.

References

External links 

 Nemanja Kovacevic at draftexpress.com
 Nemanja Kovacevic at eurobasket.com
 Nemanja Kovacevic at foxsportspulse.com
 Nemanja Kovacevic at eurobasket.com

1985 births
Living people
Basketball League of Serbia players
BK Patrioti Levice players
KK Beopetrol/Atlas Beograd players
KK Jagodina players
KK Lions/Swisslion Vršac players
KK Leotar players
KK Radnički Kragujevac (2009–2014) players
KK Tamiš players
KK Vojvodina Srbijagas players
Sportspeople from Pančevo
Point guards
Serbian expatriate basketball people in Bosnia and Herzegovina
Serbian expatriate basketball people in Hungary
Serbian expatriate basketball people in Iran
Serbian expatriate basketball people in Romania
Serbian expatriate basketball people in Slovakia
Serbian expatriate basketball people in Switzerland
Serbian men's basketball players